Panagiotis "Panos" Filippakos (born April 9, 1994) is a Greek professional basketball player for Apollon Patras of the Greek Basket League. He is a 2.02 m (6'7.5") tall power forward.

Professional career
On August 4, 2019, he signed with Panerithraikos of the Greek 2nd division. With Panerithraikos he was the Top Rebounder of the league that season. On August 13, 2021, Filippakos signed a one-year contract with AEK Athens. In 24 league games, he averaged 3.6 points and 2.5 rebounds in under 10 minutes per contest. On July 1, 2022, Filippakos renewed his contract with AEK through 2024. On December 19 of the same year, he mutually parted ways with the club. In 15 league games, he averaged 2.5 points per contest. On Christmas Day, 2022, Filippakos signed with Apollon Patras for the rest of the season.

References

External links
Eurobasket.com Profile
Greek Basket League Profile 
RealGM.com Profile
ProBallers.com Profile

1994 births
Living people
AEK B.C. players
Apollon Patras B.C. players
Greek men's basketball players
Ionikos Nikaias B.C. players
Koroivos B.C. players
Power forwards (basketball)
Panionios B.C. players
Peristeri B.C. players
Basketball players from Athens